Clifford Hollow Bridge is a four-lane,  bridge in Hardy County, West Virginia.

The bridge was completed in 2003.

Clifford Hollow Bridge was awarded winning long-span steel bridge in the 2005 National Steel Bridge Alliance (NSBA) Prize Bridge Award Competition.

References

Buildings and structures in Hardy County, West Virginia
Transportation in Hardy County, West Virginia
Bridges completed in 2003
Road bridges in West Virginia
Bridges of the United States Numbered Highway System
Steel bridges in the United States
Girder bridges in the United States